The 1960 Dwars door België was the 16th edition of the Dwars door Vlaanderen cycle race and was held on 26–27 March 1960. The race started and finished in Waregem. The race was won by Arthur Decabooter.

General classification

References

1960
1960 in road cycling
1960 in Belgian sport